Aryeh Neier (born April 22, 1937) is an American human rights activist who co-founded Human Rights Watch, served as the president of George Soros's  Open Society Institute philanthropy network from 1993 to 2012, had been National Director of the American Civil Liberties Union from 1970 to 1978, and he was also involved with the creation of the group SDS by being directly involved in the group SLID's renaming.

Early life and education
Neier was born into a German Jewish family in Berlin, then in Nazi Germany. He was the son of Wolf (a teacher) and Gitla (Bendzinska) Neier, and he became a refugee as a child when his family fled in 1939 when he was two years old. He graduated from Cornell University with highest honors in 1961.

Career
He served as an adjunct professor of law at New York University.

Neier was hired by the ACLU in 1963 and became the organization's executive director in 1970. During his time as executive director, he helped grow the organization's membership from 140,000 to 200,000. Neier was criticized for his decision to have the ACLU support the National Socialist Party of America, a Neo-Nazi group, in its efforts to march in Skokie, Illinois, in the case National Socialist Party of America v. Village of Skokie, despite the presence in Skokie of large numbers of Jews and Holocaust survivors. The ACLU's representation of the group resulted in 30,000 members who ended their ACLU membership. He also led the ACLU's efforts to protect the civil rights of prisoners and those in mental hospitals, fought for the abolition of the death penalty and to make abortions available to those who need them. In his 1979 book, Defending My Enemy: American Nazis in Skokie, Illinois, and the Risks of Freedom, Neier defended his actions in support of the Skokie march, arguing that Jews are best protected by ensuring that the rule of law allowing minorities to speak out is afforded to all groups.

At a party in Washington, D.C., in early 1976, an attendee from New York indicated that he would not vote for Jimmy Carter for president because of his Southern accent, to which Charles Morgan, Jr., the ACLU's legislative director replied "That's bigotry, and that makes you a bigot." Neier reprimanded Morgan, criticizing Morgan for taking a public position on a candidate for public office. Morgan resigned from his post in April 1976, citing efforts by the bureaucracy at the ACLU to restrict his public statements.

In 1978 he was among the founders of Helsinki Watch, which was renamed Human Rights Watch in 1988. As a human rights activist, Neier has led investigations of human rights abuses around the world, including his role in the creation of the International Criminal Tribunal for the former Yugoslavia. He has contributed articles and opinion pieces to newspapers, magazines and journals including The New York Review of Books, The New York Times Book Review and Foreign Policy.

He now teaches a course called "Promoting Human Rights: History, Law, Methods and Current Controversies" at the Paris School of International Affairs, Sciences Po, in Paris.

Books
Dossier: The Secret Files They Keep on You (1974)
Crime and Punishment: A Radical Solution (1976)
Defending My Enemy: American Nazis in Skokie, Illinois, and the Risks of Freedom (1979)
Only Judgment: The Limits of Litigation in Social Change (1982)
War Crimes: Brutality, Terror, and the Struggle for Justice (1998)
Taking Liberties: Four Decades in the Struggle for Rights (2003)
The International Human Rights Movement (2012)

References

External links
 Biographical Interview with Aryeh Neier published at "Quellen zur Geschichte der Menschenrechte"

American civil rights lawyers
American Civil Liberties Union people
Skokie Controversy
American human rights activists
Human Rights Watch people
Jewish human rights activists
Jewish American writers
George Soros
Jewish emigrants from Nazi Germany to the United States
1937 births
Living people